Charles Hunter Stewart  (29 September 1854 – 30 June 1924) was a Scottish physician and public health expert.

Born in Edinburgh, Stewart studied medicine at the University of Edinburgh. In 1884 he became an assistant at the Laboratory of Public Health in Edinburgh under Henry Littlejohn.

In 1888 he was elected a Fellow of the Royal Society of Edinburgh. His proposers were Sir Andrew Douglas Maclagan, Sir William Turner, Alexander Crum Brown and Peter Guthrie Tait. He was then living at 2 Bellevue Terrace.

In 1898 he became Professor of Public Health at the University of Edinburgh

In 1900 he was living at 9 Learmonth Gardens in Edinburgh's West End.

He died three months before his 70th birthday.

Family
He married twice, firstly in 1888 to Ann Maria Gibson (d.1905), and after her death, in 1912 he married Agnes Millar McGibbon Somers, daughter of Robert Somers of Stirling.

References

1854 births
1924 deaths
Medical doctors from Edinburgh
Alumni of the University of Edinburgh
Academics of the University of Edinburgh
19th-century Scottish medical doctors
Fellows of the Royal Society of Edinburgh
20th-century Scottish medical doctors
Fellows of the Society of Antiquaries of Scotland